I Hear Music is a compilation album of songs by American pop rock duo England Dan & John Ford Coley, released by A&M Records several years after the various A&M recording sessions. Four songs, "Tell Her Hello", "New Jersey", "Mud and Stone" and "Miss Me", had already been released on the 1970 album England Dan & John Ford Coley. The other songs were recorded around 1970–72 for the album Fables (1971) or other shelved projects. After showing only minor success in the US with "New Jersey" (number 102) and better results in Japan with "Simone" (number 1), the duo was cut from the A&M roster in 1972. A&M kept testing the market, though, releasing "I Hear the Music" as a promotional single in September 1973. England Dan & John Ford Coley were left without a record company for a few years, but they participated in various projects including two Seals & Crofts albums.

After the duo's huge 1976 hit single "I'd Really Love to See You Tonight", released through Big Tree Records, A&M capitalized on the market success by releasing an album of tracks recorded years earlier. The UK version of the album includes "Simone" as an extra track.

Track listing
All songs written by England Dan and John Ford Coley.

Side One
"Used To You" - 2:58
"Tell Her Hello" - 3:14
"New Jersey" - 3:01
"Idolizer" - 3:07
"Mud and Stone" - 2:47

Side Two
"I Hear the Music" - 3:14
"Legendary Captain" - 3:36
"Miss Me" - 3:07
"The Pilot" - 2:36
"Carry On" - 3:18

Personnel
 Vocals – Dan Seals, John Ford Coley
 Guitars – Dan Seals, John Ford Coley, Louie Shelton
 Sitar – Louie Shelton
 Keyboards – Clarence McDonald, John Ford Coley, David Paich
 Bass – Joe Osborn, Max Bennett, David Hungate, Louie Shelton
 Drums – Jeff Porcaro, Jim Gordon, Ronnie Tutt
 Percussion – Mark Stevens, Alan Estes
 Harmonica – Tommy Morgan

Production
 Producer – Louie Shelton
 Engineers – Joseph Bogan, Larry Forkner, Ray Gerhardt, Dave Hassinger, Henry Lewy and Rick Porter.
 Mastered by Frank DeLuna at A&M Mastering Studios (Hollywood, CA).
 Art Direction – Roland Young 
 Design – Junie Osaki
 Photography – Ruan O’Lochlainn

References

1976 albums
England Dan & John Ford Coley albums
A&M Records albums
Albums recorded at A&M Studios